Steve Walters (born 28 August 1965), also known by the nickname of "Boxhead", is an Australian former professional rugby league footballer who played in the 1980s and 1990s who at the peak of his career was considered the best  in the game. An Australian Kangaroos and Queensland Maroons representative, he played in the Canberra Raiders' 1st, 2nd and 3rd NSWRL grand final victories.

Background
Walters was born in Rockhampton, Queensland His family relocated to Ipswich, QLD when he were a young boy. Steve is the eldest of the three Walters brothers (Kerrod and Kevin), but was the last of them to gain Australian Test selection honours.

Playing career

In Ipswich there that he started his playing career for the Booval club. He then played in the Brisbane Rugby League for the Norths club. In 1986 Walters made his Winfield Cup debut with the Canberra Raiders. He played for Canberra at hooker in the 1987 NSWRL season's grand final loss to the Manly Sea Eagles alongside his brother Kevin. Walters played for Canberra at hooker in the 1989 NSWRL season's first ever premiership victory over the Balmain Tigers alongside his brother Kevin as well. He then traveled with the Raiders to England for the 1989 World Club Challenge, playing hooker in their loss to British champions, Widnes.

Walters was selected by Queensland to play at hooker for game I of the 1990 State of Origin series, being replaced by his brother Kerrod for games II and III. Walters played in the 1990 NSWRL season's grand final at hooker in the Raiders' victory over the Penrith Panthers. Walters was selected as Queensland's hooker for all three games of the 1991 State of Origin series, being named man-of-the-match in game II. He was then selected as Australia's hooker for all three games of the 1991 Trans-Tasman Test series against New Zealand. The Canberra Raiders reached the 1991 NSWRL season's grand final and Walters played at hooker in the loss to the Penrith Panthers.

Walters was selected as Queensland's hooker for all three games of the 1992 State of Origin series. He was then selected as Australia's hooker for all three of the 1992 Great Britain Lions tour of Australasia's Ashes Tests alongside his brother Kevin. Walters was selected as Queensland's hooker for all three games of the 1993 State of Origin series. He was then selected as Australia's hooker for all three games of the 1993 Trans-Tasman Test series. For the 1993 NSWRL season Walters was named Rugby League Week's player of the year.

Walters was selected to play for Queensland at hooker in games I and III of the 1994 State of Origin series. He was then selected as Australia's hooker for the 1994 French rugby league Oceania tour's sole test match. alters, with the Canberra Raiders, reached the 1994 NSWRL season's Grand Final, in which he played at hooker in the victory over the Canterbury-Bankstown Bulldogs. Steve was also man-of-the-match in Australia's victory over Great Britain in the third and deciding match of the series.

Due to the Super League War Walters, along with many of his Canberra team-mates, was a notable exclusion from the 1995 State of Origin series, 1995 Trans-Tasman Test series and 1995 Rugby League World Cup. He was selected by Queensland to play at hooker in games II and III of the 1996 State of Origin series. 1996 was his last season with Canberra before moving to the North Queensland Cowboys. During the 1997 North Queensland Cowboys season Steve Walters captained 8 games. He played another season in Townsville before a final season with the Newcastle Knights in 1999.

Retirement
In 2000, Steve was awarded the Australian Sports Medal for his contribution to Australia's international standing in the sport of rugby league. In February 2008, Walters was named in the list of Australia's 100 Greatest Players (1908–2007) which was commissioned by the NRL and ARL to celebrate the code's centenary year in Australia.

References

External links

Steve Walters at yesterdayshero.com.au
Steve Walters at nrlstats.com

1965 births
Living people
Australia national rugby league team players
Australian rugby league players
Norths Devils players
Canberra Raiders players
Newcastle Knights players
North Queensland Cowboys players
Queensland Rugby League State of Origin players
Recipients of the Australian Sports Medal
Rugby league players from Ipswich, Queensland
Rugby league hookers
Steve